Norma May is a former female English international lawn bowler.

Bowls career
May was the English champion after winning the English National Championship in 1987 when she defeated Mary Price in the final of the singles.

She represented England in the fours event, at the 1990 Commonwealth Games in Auckland, New Zealand.

References

Living people
English female bowls players
Bowls players at the 1990 Commonwealth Games
Year of birth missing (living people)
Commonwealth Games competitors for England